Galgula is a genus of moths of the family Noctuidae.

Species
 Galgula castra Schaus, 1898
 Galgula partita Guenée, 1852
 Galgula subapicalis Hampson, 1909

References
 Natural History Museum Lepidoptera genus database
 Galgula at funet

External links

Hadeninae